James Douglas Sheahan Neesham (born 17 September 1990), better known as Jimmy Neesham, is a New Zealand international cricketer who has played for New Zealand cricket team. He currently plays in various T20 leagues around the globe as an All-rounder.

Domestic and T20 franchise career
Neesham began his first-class career with Auckland, but a move to Otago Volts worked well for him, as he made some important contributions in the 50-over format in the 2011/12 season, making three 40-plus scores in seven innings, all of them coming at more than a run a ball. He was among the wickets too, taking a career-best 5 for 44 against Wellington and 4 for 23 against Canterbury. The rewards came soon, as he was included in the limited-overs squads for the tour to South Africa.

Neesham was picked in IPL by Delhi Daredevils for season 7 and played for Guyana Amazon Warriors in the 2014 Caribbean Premier League, and for Derbyshire in the English 2016 NatWest t20 Blast. In June 2017 he signed to play for Kent County Cricket Club in the 2017 NatWest t20 Blast, making his debut in Kent's opening match of the tournament in July.

In June 2018, Neesham was awarded a contract with Wellington for the 2018–19 season.

In June 2019, he was selected to play for the Edmonton Royals franchise team in the 2019 Global T20 Canada tournament.

In the 2020 IPL auction, he was bought by the Kings XI Punjab and in 2021 was bought by Mumbai Indians. In February 2022, he was bought by the Rajasthan Royals in the auction for the 2022 Indian Premier League tournament.

International career
Neesham made his Test debut against India, scoring an unbeaten 137, the highest score on debut by a Test number 8 batsman. In June 2014, he made a century in his second test against the West Indies, becoming the first New Zealander to score centuries in his first two matches.

Neesham was named in New Zealand's 15 man squad for the 2017 ICC Champions Trophy. On 3 January 2019, in the first ODI against Sri Lanka, Neesham scored 34 runs in one over, including five sixes. This was the most runs scored in one over by a New Zealand batsman in an ODI match.

In April 2019, he was named in New Zealand's squad for the 2019 Cricket World Cup. On 1 June 2019, in New Zealand's first match of the World Cup, Neesham played in his 50th ODI. In New Zealand's match against Afghanistan, Neesham took his first five-wicket haul and his 50th wicket in ODIs. In the 2019 Cricket World Cup semifinal, Neesham took the final wicket, and a stunning catch to dismiss Dinesh Karthik off Matt Henry's delivery. Before the World Cup Neesham revealed that he had considered retiring from international cricket 18 months prior due to poor form and injury problems but Heath Mills, the then CEO of the New Zealand Players Association, advised him to take break from cricket for 3–4 weeks and to not retire.

In August 2021, Neesham was named in New Zealand's squad for the 2021 ICC Men's T20 World Cup.

References

External links
 

1990 births
Auckland cricketers
Cricketers at the 2019 Cricket World Cup
Cricketers who made a century on Test debut
Delhi Capitals cricketers
Derbyshire cricketers
Essex cricketers
Guyana Amazon Warriors cricketers
Kent cricketers
Living people
Mumbai Indians cricketers
New Zealand Test cricketers
New Zealand One Day International cricketers
New Zealand Twenty20 International cricketers
North Island cricketers
Otago cricketers
Punjab Kings cricketers
Trinbago Knight Riders cricketers
Wellington cricketers
Welsh Fire cricketers
Rajasthan Royals cricketers